Lancaster University is organised into four main faculties, each of which comprises multiple departments, institutes and centres.

Arts and Social Sciences 
The Faculty of Arts and Social Sciences (FASS) is one of the largest departments at the University.

 Faculty of Art
 Assure Evaluation
 Centre for Bioethics and Medical Law
 Centre for Biophotonics
 Centre for Corpus Approaches to Social Science (CASS)
 Centre for Extreme Events
 Centre for Gender and Women's Studies
 Centre for Global Eco-Innovation
 CESAGen (ESRC Centre for Economic and Social Aspects of Genomics)
 Centre for Law and Society
 Centre for Performance-Led HR
 Centre for Social Justice and Wellbeing in Education
 Centre for Transcultural Writing and Research
 Centre for North West Regional Studies
 Centre for Science Studies
 Centre for the Study of Environmental Change (CSEC)
 Confucius Institute
 Faculty of Criminology
 Demand Research Centre
 Faculty of Design
 Faculty of Economics
 Department of Educational Research
 Faculty of English and Creative Writing
 Faculty of European Languages and Cultures
 Faculty of Film Studies
 Faculty of French Studies
 Faculty of Geography (LEC)
 Faculty of German Studies
 Gulf One Lancaster Centre for Economic Research
 Faculty of Health Research
 Higher Education Research & Evaluation Centre (HERE)
 Faculty of History
 ImaginationLancaster
 Italian Studies
 Lancaster Institute for the Contemporary Arts
 Live at LICA
 Department  of Linguistics and English Language
 Literacy Research Centre
 Faculty of Media and Cultural Studies
 Faculty of Philosophy
 Faculty of Politics and International Relations
 Faculty of Politics, Philosophy and Religion
 Faculty of Psychology
 Regional Heritage Centre
 Faculty of Religious Studies
 Richardson Institute for Peace Studies
 Ruskin Centre
 Center for Security Lancaster
 Faculty of Social Work
 Faculty of Sociology
 Faculty of Spanish Studies
 Faculty of Theatre Studies
 Faculty of Women's Studies
 Wordsworth Centre
 The Work Foundation

Health and Medicine 
The Faculty of Health and Medicine was established in 2008.

 Faculty of Biological Sciences (LEC)
 Faculty of Biomedical and Life Sciences
 Centre for Disability Research (CeDR)
 Centre for Mobilities Research (CeMoRe)
 Centre for Technology Enhanced Learning
 Centre for Research in Human Development and Learning
 Centre for Training and Development (CETAD)

Management 
Lancaster University Management School (LUMS) is one of the UK's business and management schools with expertise in many fields.

 Faculty of Accounting and Finance
 Institute for Advanced Studies
 Institute for Entrepreneurship and Enterprise Development
 Centre for Family Business
 Lancaster Centre for Forecasting
 Lancaster Centre for Strategic Management
 Lancaster China Catalyst Programme
 Lancaster China Management Centre
 Lancaster University Management School
 Lancaster Leadership Centre
 Faculty of Law
 Faculty of Management Learning and Leadership
 Faculty of Management Science
 Faculty of Marketing
 Faculty of Organisation, Work and Technology

Science and Technology 

 Archaeological Unit (LUAU)
 Faculty of Chemistry
 School of Computing and Communications
 Energy Lancaster
 Faculty of Engineering
 Lancaster Environment Centre
 InfoLab21
 Faculty of Mathematics and Statistics
 Faculty of Medicine
 Faculty of Natural Sciences
 Faculty of Physics
 Quantum Technology Centre
 University Centre for Computer Corpus Research on Language (UCREL)

References 

Departments of Lancaster University